Dorcadion escherichi is a species of beetle in the family Cerambycidae. It was described by Ludwig Ganglbauer in 1897. It is known from Turkey.

See also 
Dorcadion

References

escherichi
Beetles described in 1897